The lobopodians, members of the informal group Lobopodia (from the Greek, meaning "blunt feet"), or the formally erected phylum Lobopoda Cavalier-Smith (1998), are panarthropods with stubby legs called lobopods, a term which may also be used as a common name of this group as well. While the definition of lobopodians may differ between literatures, it usually refers to a group of soft-bodied, worm-like fossil panarthropods such as Aysheaia and Hallucigenia.

The oldest near-complete fossil lobopodians date to the Lower Cambrian; some are also known from Ordovician, Silurian and Carboniferous Lagerstätten. Some bear toughened claws, plates or spines, which are commonly preserved as carbonaceous or mineralized microfossils in Cambrian strata. The grouping is considered to be paraphyletic, as the three living panarthropod groups (Arthropoda, Tardigrada and Onychophora) are thought to have evolved from lobopodian ancestors.

Definitions 

The Lobopodian concept varies from author to author. Its most general as well as the most limited sense refers to a suite of mainly Cambrian worm-like panarthropod taxa with lobopods – for example Aysheaia, Hallucigenia and Xenusion, members which were traditionally united as "xenusians" or "xenusiids" (class Xenusia). The dinocaridid genera Pambdelurion and Kerygmachela may also be regarded as lobopodians, eventually referred as "gilled lobopodians" or "gilled lobopod". Under such definitions, "Lobopodia" compose of only extinct taxa, and widely accepted as an informal, paraphyletic grade in correspond to the crown-group of three extant panarthropod phyla: Onychophora (velvet worms), Tardigrada (waterbears) and Arthropoda (arthropods). 

An alternative, broader definition of lobopodians would also incorporate the extant phyla Onychophora and Tardigrada, two groups of panarthropod which bear lobopodous limbs as well. "Lobopodia" may also refer to a possible clade sister to Arthropoda, and compose of only Tardigrada and Onychophora. Lobopodia sometimes also included Pentastomida, a group of parasitic panarthropod which traditionally though to be a unique phylum, but revealed by subsequent phylogenomic and anatomical studies as a highly specialized taxon of crustacean arthropods. The broadest definition proposes the monophyletic superphylum Lobopodia is equivalent to Panarthropoda.

Representative taxa

The better-known genera include, for example, Aysheaia, which was discovered in the Canadian Burgess Shale and Hallucigenia, known from both the Chenjiang Maotianshan Shale and the Burgess Shale. Aysheaia pedunculata has a morphology apparently basic for lobopodians — for example, a significantly annulated cuticle, a terminal mouth opening, specialized frontalmost appendages, and stubby lobopods with terminal claws. Hallucigenia sparsa is famous for having a complex history of interpretation — it was originally reconstructed with long, stilt-like legs and mysterious fleshy dorsal protuberances, and was long considered a prime example of the way in which nature experimented with the most diverse and bizarre body designs during the Cambrian. However, further discoveries showed that this reconstruction had placed the animal upside-down: interpreting the "stilts" as dorsal spines made it clear that the fleshy "dorsal" protuberances were actually elongated lobopods. More recent reconstruction even exchanged the front and rear ends of the animal: it was revealed that the bulbous imprint previously thought to be a head was actually gut contents being expelled from the anus.

Microdictyon is another charismatic as well as the speciose genus of lobopodians resembling Hallucigenia, but instead of spines, it bore pairs of net-like plates, which are often found disarticulated and are known as an example of small shelly fossils (SSF). Xenusion has the oldest fossil record amongst the described lobopodians, which may trace back to Cambrian Stage 2. Luolishania is an iconic example of lobopodians with multiple pairs of specialized appendages. The gill lobopodians Kerygmachela and Pambdelurion shed light on the relationship between lobopodians and arthropods, as they have both lobopodian affinities and characteristics linked to the arthropod stem-group.

Morphology

Most lobopodians were only a few centimeters in length, while some genera grew up to over 20 centimeters. Their bodies are annulated, although the presence of annulation may differ between position or taxa, and sometimes difficult to discern due to their close spacing and low relief on the fossil materials. Body and appendages are circular in cross-section.

Head 

Due to the usually poor preservation, detailed reconstructions of the head region are only available for a handful of lobopodian species. The head of a lobopodian is more or less bulbous, and sometime possesses a pair of pre-ocular, presumely protocerebral appendages – for example, primary antennae or well-developed frontal appendages, which are individualized from the trunk lobopods (with the exception of Antennacanthopodia, which have two pairs of head appendages instead of one). Mouthparts may consist of rows of teeth or a conical proboscis. The eyes may be represented by a single ocellus or by numerous pairs of simple ocelli, as has been shown in Luolishania (=Miraluolishania), Ovatiovermis, Onychodictyon, Hallucigenia, Facivermis, and less certainly Aysheaia as well. However, in gilled lobopodians like Kerygmachela, the eyes are relatively complex reflective patches that may had been compound in nature.

Trunk and lobopods 

The trunk is elongated and composed of numerous body segments (somites), each bearing a pair of legs technically called lobopods or lobopodous limbs. The segmental boundaries are not as externally significant as those of arthropods, although they are indicated by heteronomous annulations (i.e., the alternation of annulation density corresponding to the position of segmental boundaries) in some species. The trunk segments may bear other external, segment-corresponding structures such as nodes (e.g. Hadranax, Kerygmachela), papillae (e.g. Onychodictyon), spine/plate-like sclerites (e.g. armoured lobopodians) or lateral flaps (e.g. gilled lobopodians). The trunk may terminate with a pair of lobopods (e.g. Aysheaia, Hallucigenia sparsa) or a tail-like extension (e.g. Paucipodia, Siberion, Jianshanopodia).

The lobopods are flexible and loosely conical in shape, tapering from the body to tips that may  or may not  bear claws. The claws, if present, are hardened structures with a shape resembling a hook or gently-curved spine. Claw-bearing lobopods usually have 2 claws, but single claws are known (e.g. posterior lobopods of luolishaniids), as are more than 2 (e.g. 3 in Tritonychus, 7 in Aysheaia) depending on its segmental or taxonomical association. In some genera, the lobopods bear additional structures such as spines (e.g. Diania), fleshy outgrowths (e.g. Onychodictyon), or tubercules (e.g. Jianshanopodia). There is no sign of arthropodization (development of a hardened exoskeleton and segmental division on panarthropod appendages) in known members of lobopodians, even for those belonging to the arthropod stem-group (e.g. gilled lobopodians and siberiids), and the suspected case of arthropodization on the limbs of Diania is considered to be a misinterpretation.

Differentiation (tagmosis) between trunk somites barely occurs, except in hallucigenids and luolishaniids, where numerous pairs of their anterior lobopods are significantly slender (hallucigenids) or setose (luolishaniids) in contrast to their posterior counterparts.

Internal structures 

The gut of lobopodians is often straight, undifferentiated, and sometimes preserved in the fossil record in three dimensions. In some specimens the gut is found to be filled with sediment. The gut consists of a central tube occupying the full length of the lobopodian's trunk, which does not change much in width - at least not systematically. However in some groups, specifically the gilled lobopodians and siberiids, the gut is surrounded by pairs of serially repeated, kidney-shaped gut diverticulae (digestive glands). In some specimens, parts of the lobopodian gut can be preserved in three dimensions. This cannot result from phosphatisation, which is usually responsible for 3-D gut preservation, because the phosphate content of the guts is under 1%; the contents comprise quartz and muscovite. The gut of the representative Paucipodia is variable in width, being widest at the centre of the body. Its position in the body cavity is only loosely fixed, so flexibility is possible.

Not much is known about the neural anatomy of lobopodians due to the spare and mostly ambiguous fossil evidence. Possible traces of a nervous system were found in Paucipodia, Megadictyon and Antennacanthopodia. The first and so far the only confirmed evidence of lobopodian neural structures comes from the gilled lobopodian Kerygmachela in Park et al. 2018 — it presents a brain composed of only a protocerebrum (the frontal-most cerebral ganglion of panarthropods) that is directly connected to the nerves of eyes and frontal appendages, suggesting the protocerebral ancestry of the head of lobopodians as well as the whole Panarthropoda.

In some extant ecdysozoan such as priapulids and onychophorans, there is a layer of outermost circular muscles and a layer of innermost longitudinal muscles. The onychophorans also have a third, intermediate, layer of interwoven oblique muscles. Musculature of the gilled lobopodian Pambdelurion shows a similar anatomy, but that of the lobopodian Tritonychus shows the opposite pattern: it is the outermost muscles that are longitudinal and the innermost layer that consists of circular muscles.

Categories 

Based on external morphology, lobopdians may fall under different categories — for example the general worm-like taxa as "xenusiid" or "xenusian"; xenusiid with sclerite as "armoured lobopodians"; and taxa with both robust frontal appendages and lateral flaps as "gilled lobopodians". Some of them were originally defined under a taxonomic sense (e.g. class Xenusia), but neither any of them are generally accepted as monophyletic in further studies.

Armoured lobopodians 

Armoured lobopodians referred to xenusiid lobopodians which bore repeated sclerites such as spine or plates on their trunk (e.g. Hallucigenia, Microdictyon, Luolishania) or lobopods (e.g. Diania). In contrast, lobopodians without sclerites may be referred to as "unarmoured lobopodians". Function of the sclerites were interpreted as protective armor and/or muscle attachment points. In some cases, only the disarticulated sclerites of the animal were preserved, which represented as component of small shelly fossils (SSF). Armoured lobopodians were suggest to be onychophoran-related and may even represent a clade in some previous studies, but their phylogenetic positions in later studies are controversial. (see text)

Gilled lobopodians 

Dinocaridids with lobopodian affinities (due to shared features like annulation and lobopods) are referred to as "gilled lobopodians" or "gilled lobopods". These forms sport a pair of flaps on each trunk segment, but otherwise no signs of arthropodization, in contrast to more derived dinocaridids like the Radiodonta that have robust and sclerotized frontal appendages. Gilled lobopodians cover at least two genera: Pambdelurion and Kerygmachela. Opabinia may also fall under this category in a broader sense, although the presence of lobopods in this genus is not definitively proven. Omnidens, a genus known only from a Pambdelurion-like mouth apparatus, may also be a gilled lobopodian. The body flaps may have functioned as both swimming appendages and gills, and are possibly homologous to the dorsal flaps of radiodonts and exites of Euarthropoda. Whether these genera were true lobopodians is still contested by some. However, they are widely accepted as stem-group arthropods just basal to radiodonts.

Siberion and similar taxa 

Siberion, Megadictyon and Jianshanopodia may be grouped as siberiids (order Siberiida), jianshanopodians or "giant lobopodians" by some literatures. They are generally large (body length ranging between 7 and 22 centimeters) xenusiid lobopodians with widen trunk, stout trunk lobopods without evidence of claws, and most notably a pair of robust frontal appendages. With the possible exception of Siberion, they also have digestive glands like those of a gilled lobopodian and basal euarthropod. Their anatomy represent transitional forms between typical xenusiids and gilled lobopodians, eventually placing them under the basalmost position of arthropod stem-group.

Paleoecology 

Lobopodians possibly occupied a wide range of ecological niches. Although most of them had undifferentiated appendages and straight gut, which would suggest a simple sediment-feeding lifestyle, sophisticated digestive glands and large size of gilled lobopodians and siberiids would allow them to consume larger food items, and their robust frontal appendages may even suggest a predatory lifestyle. On the other hand, luolishaniids such as Luolishania and Ovatiovermis have elaborate feather-like lobopods that presumably formed 'baskets' for suspension or filter-feeding. Lobopods with curved termial claws may have given some lobopodians the ability to climb on substrances.

Not much is known about the physiology of lobopodians. There are evidence suggest that lobopodians moult just like other ecdysozoan taxa, but the outline and ornamentation of the harden sclerite did not vary during ontogeny. The gill-like structures on the body flaps of gilled lobopodians and ramified extensions on the lobopods of Jianshanopodia may provide respiratory function (gills). Pambdelurion may control the movement of their lobopods in a way similar to onychophorans.

Distribution

During the Cambrian, lobopodians displayed a substantial degree of biodiversity. One species is known from each of the Ordovician and Silurian periods, with a few more known from the Carboniferous (Mazon Creek) — this represents the paucity of exceptional lagerstatten in post-Cambrian deposits.

Phylogeny

The overall phylogenetic interpretation on lobopodians changed dramatically beyond decades. The reassignments are not only based on new fossil evidence, but also new embryological, neuroanatomical, and genomic (e.g. gene expression, phylogenomics) informations observed from extant panarthropod taxa.

Based on their apparently onychophoran-like morphology (e.g. annulated cuticle, lobopodous appendage with claws), lobopodians were traditionally thought to be present a group of paleozoic onychophorans. This interpretation was flawed after the discovery of lobopodians with arthropod and tardigrade-like characters, suggest the similarity between lobopodians and onychophorans represent deeper panarthropod ancestral trait (plesiomorphies) instead of onychophoran-exclusive characters (synapomorphies). For example, The British palaeontologist Graham Budd sees the Lobopodia as representing a basal grade from which the phyla Onychophora and Arthropoda arose, with Aysheaia comparable to the ancestral plan, and with forms like Kerygmachela and Pambdelurion representing a transition that, via dinocaridids to arthropods, would lead to an arthropod body plan. Aysheaia's surface ornamentation, if homologous with palaeoscolecid sclerites, may represent a deeper link connecting it with cycloneuralian outgroups. Many further studies follow and extend the idea, generally agreed that all three panarthropod phyla have lobopodians in their stem lineages. Lobopodians are thus paraphyletic, and include the last common ancestor of arthropods, onychophorans and tardigrades.

As stem-group arthropods

Compared to other panarthropod stem-groups, suggestion on the lobopodian members of arthropod stem-group is relatively consistent  — siberiid like Megadictyon and Jianshanopodia occupied the basalmost position, gilled lobopodians Pambdelurion and Kerygmachela branch next, and finally lead to a clade compose of Opabinia, Radiodonta and Euarthropoda (crown-group arthropods). Their positions within arthropod stem-group are indicated by numerous arthropod groundplans and intermediate forms (e.g. arthropod-like digestive glands, radiodont-like frontal appendages and dorso-ventral appendicular structures link to arthropod biramous appendages). Lobopodian ancestry of arthropods also reinforced by genomic studies on extant taxa — gene expression support the homology between arthropod appendages and onychophoran lobopods, suggests that modern less-segmented arthropodized appendages evolved from annulated lobopodous limbs, with multipodomerous appendages of extinct basal euarthropods (e.g. fuxianhuiids) may represent an intermediate form. On the other hand, primary antennae and frontal appendages of lobopodians and dinocaridids may be homologous to the labrum/hypostome complex of euarthropods, an idea support by their protocerebral origin and developmental pattern of the labrum of extant arthropods.

Diania, a genus of armoured lobopodian with stout and spiny legs, were originally thought to be associated within the arthropod stem-group based on its apparently arthropod-like (arthropodized) trunk appendages. However, this interpretation is questionable as the data provided by the original description are not consistent with the suspected phylogenic relationships. Further re-examination even revealed that the suspected arthropodization on the legs of Diania was a misinterpretation — although the spine may have hardened, the remaining cuticle of Diania's legs were soft (not harden nor scleritzed), lacking any evidence of pivot joint and arthrodial membrane, suggest the legs are lobopods with only widely-spaced annulations. Thus, the re-examination eventually reject the evidence of arthropodization (sclerotization, segmentation and articulation) on the appendages as well as the fundamental relationship between Diania and arthropods.

As stem-group onychophorans

While Antennacanthopodia is widely accepted as a member of stem-group onychophoran, position of other xenusiid genera that previously though to be onychophoran-related are controversial — in further studies, most of them were either suggest to be stem-group onychophorans or basal panarthropods, with a few species (Aysheaia or Onychodictyon ferox) occasionally suggest to be stem-group tardigrades. A study in 2014 suggest that Hallucigenia are stem-group onychophorans based on their claws, which have overlapped internal structures resemble to those of an extant onychophoran. This interpretation was questioned by later studies, as the structures may present panarthropod plesiomorphy.

As stem-group tardigrades

Lobopodian taxa of tardigrade stem-group is unclear. Aysheaia or Onychodictyon ferox had been suggest to be a possible member, based on the high claw number (in Aysheaia) and/or terminal lobopods with anterior-facing claws  (in both taxa). Although not widely accepted, there are even suggestions that Tardigrada itself representing the basalmost panarthropod or branch between the arthropod stem-group.

As stem-group panarthropods

It is unclear that which lobopodians represent members of the panarthropod stem-group, which were branched just before the last common ancestor of extant panarthropod phyla. Aysheaia may have occupied this position based on its apparently basic morphology; while other studies rather suggest luolishaniid and hallucigenid, two lobopodian taxa which had been resolved as members of stem-group onychophorans as well.

Described genera 

As of 2018, over 20 lobopodian genera have been described. The fossil materials being described as lobopodians Mureropodia apae and Aysheaia prolata are considered to be disarticulated frontal appendages of the radiodonts Caryosyntrips and Stanleycaris, respectively. Miraluolishania was suggested to be synonym of Luolishania by some studies. The enigmatic Facivermis was later revealed to be a highly specialized genus of luolishaniid lobopodians.

Antennacanthopodia
Aysheaia
Carbotubulus
Cardiodictyon
Collinsium
Collinsovermis
Diania
Facivermis
Fusuconcharium
Hadranax
 Hallucigenia
Jianshanopodia
Kerygmachela
Lenisambulatrix
Luolishania (=Miraluolishania)
Megadictyon
Microdictyon
Onychodictyon
Orstenotubulus
Ovatiovermis
Pambdelurion
Paucipodia
Quadratapora
Siberion
Thanahita
Tritonychus
Xenusion

References 

 
Prehistoric protostomes
Cambrian Series 2 first appearances
Paraphyletic groups
Panarthropoda